The Robert Samut Hall is a late 19th-century defunct Methodist church, formerly named Wesleyan (Methodist) Church, now a state owned building in Floriana, Malta.

Origins
The current Neo-Gothic church was built between 1881 and 1883 on designs by architect Thomas Mullet Ellis. It was opened for worship on 18 March 1883. It was the first building in Malta to make use of electricity.

Secularised
The church was given to the government in the early 1970s. On 4 April 1975, the building was inaugurated as a centre for cultural activities and renamed Robert Samut Hall. The hall houses an interesting 2 manual pneumatic Willis organ.

Further reading

See also

Culture of Malta
History of Malta
List of Churches in Malta
Religion in Malta

References

Floriana
Former churches in Malta
19th-century Methodist church buildings
Religious buildings and structures completed in 1883
1883 establishments in Malta
Gothic Revival church buildings in Malta
19th-century churches in Malta